Islamitdin Nasrullayevich Abdullayev (born 18 March 2000) is a Russian football player who plays for FC Dynamo Makhachkala.

Club career
He made his debut in the Russian Football National League for FC Rotor Volgograd on 29 August 2021 in a game against FC Tom Tomsk.

References

External links
 
 Profile by Russian Football National League

2000 births
Footballers from Makhachkala
Living people
Russian footballers
Association football defenders
FC Rotor Volgograd players
FC Dynamo Makhachkala players
Russian Second League players
Russian First League players